Thomas Stringer may refer to:
 Thomas Stringer (carpenter) (1886–1945), American deafblind carpenter
 Thomas Stringer (cricketer) (1873–?), English cricketer
 Thomas Walter Stringer (1855–1944), New Zealand judge
 Thomas W. Stringer (1815–1893), American Christian minister and state senator in Mississippi